Kamlavati Senior Secondary School ( ISO 9001:2008 Certified)   is an educational institution situated in Sahupuram sector, Arumuganeri town of Thoothukudi district, Tamil Nadu, India. The school follows CBSE pattern from class 1 to 12 and also follows Tamil Nadu State Board syllabus for class 11 and 12.It is a private educational institution originally started in 1972 as part of educational assistance to the children of DCW workers. Later it opened its admissions to general public. The school is managed by DCW ltd through Kamlavati Higher Secondary School Trust.

History
The school was founded in 1972 by Padmabhushan Shri Sahu Shriyans Prasad Jain, a former member of Rajya Sabha in the name of his wife Shrimati Kamlavati Jain.

Education system
The school follows State Board syllabus for KG and class 11,12 and CBSE syllabus for class 1 to 10.

School Shifts and Timings
The school runs on Monday to Saturday on three shifts. Shift 1 for LKG,UKG,Class I and II starts from 10:20 AM to 02:20 PM . Shift 2 for classes III to V starts from 09:30 AM to 03:15 PM. Shift 3 for classes VI to XII starts from 08:30 AM to 04:30 PM.

Transporting facilities
The school provides transport facilities (Bus and van) for students. The school can also be accessed through other means of transport. The nearest bus stopping is Sahupuram bus stop on south and DCW chemical stop on north (Tuticorin - Tiruchendur state highway). The nearest railway station is Arumuganeri railway station (Tiruchendur- Tirunelveli route). The nearest airport is Tuticorin airport.

External links
Official website 
Kamlavati School in News

References

Thoothukudi
Education in Thoothukudi